SMB2 may refer to:

 SMB 2.0 (also SMB2), a new version of the Server Message Block communication protocol included with Windows Vista
 Super Mystère B.2 (also SMB.2), a variant of the Dassault Super Mystère French fighter-bomber
 Super Mario Bros. 2, a Nintendo video-game from the Super Mario franchise.
 Super Monkey Ball 2, a SEGA video-game, which is also a sequel to Super Monkey Ball.